Adelusi Adeluyi  (born 2 August 1940) is a Nigerian pharmacist, legal practitioner and former Minister of Health, appointed in 1993 by Ernest Shonekan and Human Resources. He is the founder and chairman of Juli Plc, the first indigenous promoted company quoted on the Nigerian Stock Exchange .

References

Nigerian politicians
Living people
Yoruba politicians
Place of birth missing (living people)
1940 births